These are the official results of the Men's 1500 metres event at the 1999 IAAF World Championships in Seville, Spain. There were a total number of 40 participating athletes, with three qualifying heats, two semi-finals and the final held on Tuesday 24 August 1999 at 21:10h.

Final

Semi-final
Held on Sunday 22 August 1999

Heats
Held on Saturday 21 August 1999

References
 

H
1500 metres at the World Athletics Championships